Sir Hermann David Black  (15 November 1904, Sydney – 28 February 1990, Sydney) was an economist, public-affairs commentator and university chancellor. He was knighted in 1974 and appointed a Companion of the Order of Australia in 1986.

Awards included: M. Ec. (Syd), F.C.I.S., F.A.S.A., Hon. D. LITT (N'csle, NSW), Knight Bachelor, A.C. Doctor of the University (U.N.E.), (h.c.), Doctor of the University (Syd), (honoris causa).

References

Australian Knights Bachelor
Companions of the Order of Australia
1904 births
1990 deaths
Australian economists
People from Sydney
Chancellors of the University of Sydney